Commando is an American underwear company based in Vermont. Founder Kerry O'Brien pioneered "raw cut" undergarments with no seams, elastic or trim on the edges. Commando is reportedly more present at red carpet events such as the Academy Awards and New York Fashion Week than any other underwear brand. The undergarments appear at over 30 New York Fashion Week shows per season.

History
Kerry O'Brien, former senior vice president for Weber Shandwick, initially founded the company in 2003 when she launched Takeouts, a line of removable bra inserts packaged in Chinese-food-type containers. In 2005, O'Brien introduced her line of "raw cut" undergarments called Commando, named after the phrase "going commando." After the line's launch, it received attention from fashion designers around the country and the company was later renamed Commando.

Initially, O'Brien sold her line to retailers door to door. In the first year of operations, more than 500 stores sold Commando and the company reached $1 million in sales.

O'Brien designs undergarments that do not show under clothing and are made without elastic. Her elastic-free waistband and weighted slip are patented. Commando undergarments led to O'Brien's nomination to serve on the Council of Fashion Designers of America.

Overview
Commando products are made with microfiber, seamless, and are raw cut. They are sold online as well as in 1,200 department stores including Bloomingdale's, Neiman Marcus, Nordstrom and Saks Fifth Avenue. Commando is considered to have a wide celebrity following and has been worn by public figures such as Rihanna, Jennifer Lopez, Jessica Alba, Emily Blunt, Emma Watson, Kim Kardashian, Kristen Stewart and Jennifer Lawrence. Fashion stylists and fashion labels that use the brand include Brad Goreski, Prabal Gurung, Lela Rose, Milly, Monique Lhuillier, Tracy Reese, Rodarte and Nicole Miller.

References

External links

Companies based in Vermont
American companies established in 2003
2003 establishments in Vermont
Clothing companies established in 2003
Clothing companies of the United States